This is a list of Church of England Instruments, which are church legislation for the Church of England. They are pieces of legislation made by virtue of powers granted by Measures of the Church of England. They are mainly used to commence measures.

2010

The Vacancies in Suffragan Sees and Other Ecclesiastical Office Measure 2010 (Appointed Day No. 1) Instrument 2010

2009

Ecclesiastical Offices (Terms of Service) Measure 2009 (Appointed Day Instrument 2009)
Ecclesiastical Offices (Terms of Service) Measure 2009 (Appointed Day Instrument 2009)

2008
Dioceses, Pastoral and Mission Measure 2007 (Appointed Day Instrument 2008)
Church of England Marriage Measure 2008 (Appointed Day Instrument 2008)
Dioceses, Pastoral and Mission Measure 2007 (Appointed Day Instrument 2008)
Dioceses, Pastoral and Mission Measure 2007 (Appointed Day Instrument 2008)

2007
Church of England (Miscellaneous Provisions) Measure 2006 (Appointed Day Instrument 2007)
Care of Cathedrals (Amendment) Measure 2005 (Appointed Day Instrument 2007)
Dioceses, Pastoral and Mission Measure 2007 (Appointed Day Instrument 2007)

2006
Care of Cathedrals (Amendment) Measure 2005 (Appointed Day Instrument 2006)
Church of England (Miscellaneous Provisions) Measure 2006 (Appointed Day Instrument 2006)
Pastoral (Amendment) Measure 2006 (Appointed Day Instrument 2006)

2005

Clergy Discipline Measure 2003 (Appointed Day Instrument 2005)
Church of England (Miscellaneous Provisions) Measure 2005 (Appointed Day Instrument 2005)
Stipends (Cessation of Special Payments) Measure 2005 (Appointed Day Instrument 2005)
Care of Cathedrals (Amendment) Measure 2005 (Appointed Day Instrument 2005)
Clergy Discipline Measure 2003 (Appointed Day Instrument 2005)
Clergy Discipline Measure 2003 (Appointed Day Instrument 2005)

1991

 Diocesan Boards of Education Measure 1991 (Appointed Day Instrument 1991)

Instruments